Josef Hellensteiner (26 October 1889 – 7 December 1980) was an Austrian road racing cyclist who competed in the 1912 Summer Olympics. He was born in Tyrol, Austria-Hungary and died in St. Johann in Tirol, Austria.

In 1912 he was a member of the Austrian cycling team which finished seventh in the team time trial event. In the individual time trial competition he finished 45th.

References

1889 births
1980 deaths
Austrian male cyclists
Olympic cyclists of Austria
Cyclists at the 1912 Summer Olympics
Sportspeople from Tyrol (state)
20th-century Austrian people